The Ireland Wolves (formally Ireland A) is a national cricket team representing Ireland. It is the second tier of international Irish cricket, below the full Ireland national cricket team.  Matches played by Ireland Wolves are not considered to be One-Day Internationals, instead receiving first-class and List A classification.

Their first match was against the Bangladesh A cricket team in October 2017 when they toured Bangladesh to play one first-class match at the Sylhet International Cricket Stadium, Sylhet, and five List A matches at Sheikh Kamal International Cricket Stadium Academy Ground, Cox's Bazar. Bangladesh A won the first-class match and four of the List A matches, and the other was washed out.

In August 2018, the Bangladesh A cricket team made a tour to Ireland where they played a series of List A and Twenty20 matches against the Ireland Wolves. The List A series was tied 2-2, while Bangladesh A won the T20 series 2-1.

In January 2019, the Ireland Wolves travelled to Sri Lanka to play two first class matches and five List A matches. The Sri Lanka A cricket team won the 1st unofficial test by 10 wickets, while the 2nd unofficial test ended in a high scoring draw. The unofficial ODI series that followed was won 5-0 by Sri Lanka A. In January 2020, Cricket Ireland confirmed that the team would tour South Africa to play seven matches against the Namibia cricket team. In February 2021, the Wolves toured Bangladesh for a multi-format series against Bangladesh Emerging Team. In March–April 2022, the Wolves toured Namibia for three T20 and five List A 50 over games.

Playing squads

This list includes all players who have played at least 3 matches for Ireland Wolves in the past two seasons.International cap players are marked in Bold.

Coaching staff

 Head coach: Pete Johnston
 Assistant coach: Rob Cassell
 Batting coach: Ed Joyce 
 Strength & Conditioning coach: Brendan Connor
 Physiotherapist: Mark Rausa
 Performance analyst: Scott Irvine
 Manager: Chris Siddell

References

External links

Official website of Ireland cricket team
Official Facebook page of Ireland cricket team
Cricket Europe Ireland Page

Ireland in international cricket
National 'A' cricket teams
2017 establishments in Ireland